Intisari (Digest) is an Indonesian monthly general-interest magazine published by Kompas Gramedia. The magazine adopted a format similar to Reader's Digest.

History 
Intisari was first published in 1963 by Petrus Kanisius Ojong (1920–1980) and Jakob Oetama (1931–2020), with assistance from J. Adi Subrata and Irawati. It was the company's first publication.

Intisari was intended to open the horizons of Indonesian society. Its first edition had no cover and was 14 x 17.5 cm in size, in black and white and 128 pages thick. In its first publication, 11,000 copies were printed. Later editions would reach 350,000 copies. 

The online version of Intisari includes a variety of sections and categories, such as finance, career, unique, inspiration, wellness, and travelling.

Reference

External links
 Official website

1963 establishments in Indonesia
General interest digests
Kompas Gramedia Group
Magazines established in 1963
Magazines published in Indonesia
Monthly magazines published in Indonesia